Jim Masland is an American politician who has served in the Vermont House of Representatives since 1991.

References

Living people
Stanford University alumni
20th-century American politicians
21st-century American politicians
Democratic Party members of the Vermont House of Representatives
Year of birth missing (living people)